Grytviken is a settlement on South Georgia in the South Atlantic and formerly a whaling station and the largest settlement on the island. It is located at the head of King Edward Cove within the larger Cumberland East Bay, considered the best harbour on the island. The location's name, meaning "pot bay", was coined in 1902 by the Swedish Antarctic Expedition and documented by the surveyor Johan Gunnar Andersson, after the expedition found old English try pots used to render seal oil at the site. Settlement was re-established on 16 November 1904 by Norwegian Antarctic explorer Carl Anton Larsen on the long-used site of former whaling settlements.

Grytviken is built on a substantial area of sheltered, flat land and has a good supply of fresh water. Although it was the largest settlement on South Georgia, the island's administration was based at the nearby British Antarctic Survey research station at King Edward Point.  The whaling station closed in December 1966 when dwindling whale stocks made it uneconomical.

Grytviken no longer has permanent residents but occasionally accommodates researchers and British administrative and military personnel. It is also temporarily inhabited during summer months by a few staff who manage the South Georgia Museum. The settlement has become a popular attraction for Antarctic cruise lines, with many tourists visiting the resting places of polar explorers Sir Ernest Shackleton and Frank Wild in Grytviken's graveyard.

History

Carl Anton Larsen 
 

The settlement at Grytviken was established on 16 November 1904 by the Norwegian sea captain Carl Anton Larsen, as a whaling station for his Compañía Argentina de Pesca (Argentine Fishing Company). It was successful, with 195 whales taken in the first season. The whalers used every part of the animals – the blubber, meat, bones and viscera were rendered to extract the oil, and the bones and meat were turned into fertiliser and fodder. Elephant seals were also hunted for their blubber. Around 300 men worked at the station during its heyday, operating during the southern summer from October to March. A few remained over the winter to maintain the boats and factory. Every few months a transport ship would bring essential supplies to the station and take away the oil and other produce. The following year the Argentine Government established a meteorological station.

Carl Anton Larsen, the founder of Grytviken, was a naturalised Briton born in Sandefjord, Norway. In his application for British citizenship, filed with the magistrate of South Georgia and granted in 1910, Captain Larsen wrote: "I have given up my Norwegian citizen's rights and have resided here since I started whaling in this colony on the 16 November 1904 and have no reason to be of any other citizenship than British, as I have had and intend to have my residence here still for a long time." His family in Grytviken included his wife, three daughters and two sons.

As the manager of Compañía Argentina de Pesca, Larsen organised the construction of Grytviken, a remarkable undertaking accomplished by a team of sixty Norwegians between their arrival on 16 November and commencement of production at the newly built whale-oil factory on 24 December 1904.

Larsen chose the whaling station's site during his 1902 visit while in command of the ship Antarctic of the Swedish Antarctic Expedition (1901–03) led by Otto Nordenskjöld. On that occasion, the name Grytviken ("The Pot Cove") was given by the Swedish archaeologist and geologist Johan Gunnar Andersson who surveyed part of Thatcher Peninsula and found numerous artefacts and features from sealers’ habitation and industry, including a shallop (a type of small boat) and several try-pots used to boil seal oil. One of those try-pots, having the inscription ‘Johnson and Sons, Wapping Dock, London’ is preserved at the South Georgia Museum in Grytviken.

Managers and other senior officers of the whaling stations often had their families living together with them. Among them was Fridthjof Jacobsen whose wife Klara Olette Jacobsen gave birth to two of their children in Grytviken; their daughter Solveig Gunbjørg Jacobsen was the first child ever born and raised south of the Antarctic Convergence, on 8 October 1913. Several more children have been born on South Georgia: recently even aboard visiting private yachts.

The whale population in the seas around the island was substantially reduced over the following sixty years until the station closed in December 1966, by which time the whale stocks were so low that their continued exploitation was unviable. Even now, the shore around Grytviken is littered with whale bones and the rusting remains of whale oil processing plants and abandoned whaling ships.

Ernest Shackleton 

Grytviken is closely associated with the explorer Sir Ernest Shackleton. Shackleton's Imperial Trans-Antarctic Expedition set out from London on 1 August 1914, to reach the Weddell Sea on 10 January 1915, where the pack ice closed in on their ship, . The ship was broken by the ice on 27 October 1915. The 28 crew members managed to flee to Elephant Island off Antarctica, bringing three small boats with them. They arrived at Cave Cove, and camped at Peggotty Bluff, from where they trekked to Stromness on the northeast coast. From Grytviken, Shackleton organised a rescue operation to bring home the remaining men.

He again returned to Grytviken during the Shackleton-Rowett Expedition and this is where he died, shortly after New Year's Day, prior to the expedition heading south to Antarctica. His widow chose South Georgia as his final resting place so this is where he remained. His grave is located south of Grytviken, alongside those of whalers who had died on the island.

On 27 November 2011, the ashes of Frank Wild, Shackleton's "right-hand man," were interred on the right side of Shackleton's grave-site. The inscription on the rough-hewn granite block set to mark the spot reads "Frank Wild 1873–1939, Shackleton's right-hand man." Wild's relatives and Shackleton's only granddaughter, Alexandra Shackleton, attended a service conducted by Richard Hines, rector of the Falkland Islands. The writer Angie Butler discovered the ashes in the vault of Braamfontein Cemetery, Johannesburg, while researching her book The Quest for Frank Wild. She said "His ashes will now be where they were always supposed to be. It just took them a long time getting there."

Falklands War 

During the Falklands War, Grytviken was captured by Argentine forces in early April 1982 following a brief battle with Royal Marines. The Royal Marines, SAS and SBS retook the settlement three weeks later without a shot being fired in return.

Supported by the corvette  on 3 April 1982, ARA Bahía Paraíso landed a party of Argentine marines who attacked the platoon of 22 Royal Marines deployed at Grytviken. The two-hour battle resulted in ARA Guerrico being damaged and an Argentine Puma helicopter shot down. The Argentine forces sustained three men killed and a similar number of wounded, with one wounded on the British side. The British commanding officer Lieutenant Keith Mills was awarded a Distinguished Service Cross for the defence of South Georgia.

While the British magistrate and other civilians and military present in Grytviken were removed from South Georgia, another 15 Britons remained beyond Argentine reach. The losses suffered at Grytviken prevented Argentina from occupying the rest of the island, with Bird Island base, and field camps at Schlieper Bay, Lyell Glacier and St. Andrew's Bay remaining under British control.

On 25 April, the Royal Navy damaged and captured the Argentine submarine  at South Georgia. The Argentine garrison in Grytviken surrendered without returning fire. The following day the detachment in Leith Harbour commanded by Captain Alfredo Astiz also surrendered. One prisoner, Felix Artuso, was shot when guards mistakenly believed he was trying to sabotage Santa Fe, and was buried at Grytviken Cemetery. The Argentine personnel were removed from the South Sandwich Islands by HMS Endurance on 20 June. Due to evidence of an unauthorised visit, the closed station Corbeta Uruguay was destroyed in January 1983.

Current situation 

Along with the surrounding area, the station has been declared an Area of Special Tourist Interest (ASTI).

Grytviken is a popular stop for cruise ships visiting Antarctica, and tourists usually land to visit Shackleton's grave. The South Georgia Museum is housed in the manager's house of the former whaling station, and is open during the summer tourist season.

The station's church is the only building which retains its original purpose; it is still used occasionally for services. There have been several marriages in Grytviken, the first being registered on 24 February 1932, between A.G.N. Jones and Vera Riches.

On 28 January 2007, a service was conducted in remembrance of Anders Hansen (a Norwegian whaler buried at Grytviken Cemetery in 1943) and to celebrate his great-great-grandson Axel Wattø Eide's baptism occurring in Oslo the same day.

Multiple wrecks dot Grytviken, and its environs.

Geography

Climate 
Grytviken has a tundra climate (Köppen ET) with long, cold winters and short, cool summers.

Gallery

See also 
History of South Georgia and the South Sandwich Islands
King Edward Point
South Georgia Museum
Carl Anton Larsen
Viktor Esbensen
Solveig Gunbjørg Jacobsen

References

External links 

 Grytviken. Copernix satellite image
 Britain's Small Wars: The Argentine Invasion of South Georgia
 Google St View website retrieved Jan 2017
 Virtual tour of Grytviken

1904 establishments
1966 disestablishments
Populated places in British Overseas Territories
Populated places disestablished in 1966
Populated places established in 1904
Former populated places
Whaling stations of South Georgia and the South Sandwich Islands
Falklands War in South Georgia
Antarctic region